Mazdacis flavomarginata is a species of snout moth in the genus Mazdacis. It was described by Herbert Druce in 1902, and is known from Guyana and French Guiana.

References

Moths described in 1902
Epipaschiinae